The Rural Development Academy (RDA) is a specialized rural development institution in Sherpur Upazila of Bogra District, Bangladesh for training, research and action research. It was established on 19 June 1974.

The total area of The Rural Development Academy is about 48.50 hectares which includes office, residence, school & college, play ground, children's park and other establishments and about 29.50 hectares has been earmarked for demonstration farm for undertaking research in farming, horticulture, floriculture, tissue culture, pisciculture, livestock, Poultry etc.

The Rural Development Academy is an autonomous body. This institution is officiated with the Rural Development and Co-operatives Division of the Ministry of Local Government, Rural Development & Co-operatives (LGRDC).

Location

The Academy is located at Sherpur, 16 km from Bogra town. The campus is spread over a vast area that also hosts residences, conference rooms, mosque, library, a health clinic, sports complex, and other amenities. The campus has the modern facilities of urban life.

Objectives
One of the main functions of RDA is to provide training for both officials and non-official members of the public and private institutions. It is also known for undertaking quality research on different fields. Rural development academy is multi-disciplinary in nature. The faculty of the Academy consists of multiple academic disciplines. The Academy has a strength of 304 personnel including 61 Faculty Members.

Research
The Academy is mainly undertaking research on farming, horticulture, floriculture, tissue culture, pisciculture, livestock, Poultry etc.

References

External links
Development Academy (official website)

Agricultural organisations based in Bangladesh
Educational organisations based in Bangladesh
Rural development in Bangladesh
1974 establishments in Bangladesh